The Kern Center is a  athletics and fitness facility in Milwaukee, Wisconsin.  It is home to many sports at the Milwaukee School of Engineering, including ice hockey, wrestling, men's and women's basketball and volleyball.  The building is named for Robert and Patricia Kern, the center's major benefactors.  The financial support for the facility's land was given by Eckhart and Ischi Grohmann.

The Kern Center is home to the school's Health, Development, and Wellness area.  The departments in this area include Health Services, Counseling Services, and Servant-Leadership.

Ground broke for construction of the Kern Center on April 11, 2003, and the facility was dedicated on October 29, 2004.

Facilities 

The Kern Center Arena has a seating capacity of 600 and hosts MSOE varsity competitions, campus special events, and community rentals.

The Kern Center Ice Arena located in the lower level of the building, has a seating capacity of 800, and hosts hockey games, open skating, ice shows, skating lessons, campus events, and community rentals.  The ice arena also acts as the pre-season home of the Milwaukee Admirals.

References

External links 
Official Website
2004 Review by Whitney Gould – Milwaukee Architecture Critic
She's FIT

Indoor ice hockey venues in Wisconsin
Milwaukee School of Engineering
Sports venues in Milwaukee